Elite Plus is a 1991 video game published by Microplay Software.

Gameplay
Elite Plus is a game in which the player starts out with the Cobra Mark III craft, and must advance to the reach the Elite craft and status level.

Publication history
Elite Plus was released for DOS in 1991. Whereas the original Elite (1987) for the PC used CGA graphics, Elite Plus  was upgraded to take advantage of EGA, VGA and MCGA. It was coded entirely in assembly language by Chris Sawyer, who later wrote RollerCoaster Tycoon.

Reception
Stanley Trevena reviewed the game for Computer Gaming World, and stated that "Players of the original game may find it enjoyable to take a trip down memory lane with this new version of their old favorite, but most gamers probably won't have the time or space for this program in their software collection. Like the heated debate that surrounds the colorization of classic films, some classics are best left in their original form and not artificially modernized."

Computer Gaming World gave Elite Plus two-plus stars, describing it as "More detailed and complex, it is also more tedious than the original". A 1994 survey of strategic space games set in the year 2000 and later gave Elite Plus two-plus stars.

In 1991, PC Format placed Elite Plus on its list of the 50 best computer games of all time. The editors called it "a classic game that mixes solid 3D space combat with trading to create a universe in which you can spend many a happy half-hour bushwhacking the dastardly Thargoids."

Reviews
PC Format - Dec, 1995
ASM (Aktueller Software Markt) - Jun, 1991

See also 

 Elite (original version)
 Frontier: Elite II
 Elite: Dangerous

References

1991 video games
DOS games
NEC PC-9801 games
Space trading and combat simulators
Video game remakes
Video games developed in the United Kingdom